Theresa ‘Teasie’ Kearns is a former camogie player who became at the age of 14 one of the youngest All Ireland winning players in the history of the game when she starred in goal on Antrim's 1956 All Ireland Camogie Championship winning team  She won another All Ireland medal in 1967.

Career
She was one of three Dunloy sisters on the winning team. According to reporter Mitchell Cogley’s report of the match “the 14 year old Theresa Kearns brought off a save from star Cork forward Noreen Duggan which equaled that of Art Foley from Christy Ring the previous week.

Family life
Her brother played in goal for the Antrim hurling team. She was married shortly before the 1967 All Ireland semi-final, and flew back to Cork airport returning from her honeymoon to play in Antrim's 5-7 to 2–3 victory over Cork at the Mardyke.

References

External links
 Camogie.ie Official Camogie Association Website
 Wikipedia List of Camogie players

Living people
Antrim camogie players
Year of birth missing (living people)